Gregory Thomas Blum (born April 12, 1989) is an American soccer player.

Career

College
Blum spent his college career at Slippery Rock University of Pennsylvania.  During his time at Slippery Rock, he started in 72 of his 76 appearances and posted a 46-23-4 record with 21 shutouts and a 1.15 goals against average.

Professional
On March 31, 2011, Blum signed a professional contract with USL Pro club Pittsburgh Riverhounds. He debuted on July 14, 2012, when he went 90 minutes in a 2–0 loss to the Charlotte Eagles.

References

External links
 Slippery Rock University bio

1989 births
Living people
American soccer players
Pittsburgh Riverhounds SC players
USL Championship players
Soccer players from Pennsylvania
Association football goalkeepers
People from Ambridge, Pennsylvania